Bernhard Blume may refer to:

 Bernhard Blume (writer) (1901–1978), German American author and professor
 Bernhard Blume (photographer) (1937–2011), German art photographer